Sir Samuel Hoare, 1st Baronet (7 September 1841 – 20 January 1915), was an English Conservative Party politician who sat in the House of Commons from 1886 to 1906.

Family
Hoare was the eldest son of John Gurney Hoare (1810-1875) and Caroline Barclay (d. 1878) and a grandson of the diarist Louisa Gurney. His great-grandfathers included the Quaker bankers John Gurney and Samuel Hoare.

In 1866 he married Katherine Louisa Hart Davis (1846-1931), with whom he had seven children.

Education and career
Hoare was educated at Bayfield Preparatory School, Harrow School and Trinity College, Cambridge, where he played cricket in the University trials; he also played for Quidnuncs. He undertook two tours of the Mediterranean and Middle East between 1862 and 1865.

At the 1885 general election he unsuccessfully contested North Norfolk.
He was elected as a Member of Parliament (MP) for Norwich at a by-election in April 1886, and retained the seat until he stood down at the 1906 general election.

Baronetcy
In 1880 Hoare purchased Sidestrand Hall in Sidestrand, Norfolk, from the Spurrell family.

On 7 August 1899 the Hoare baronetcy, of Sidestrand Hall, was created for him. On his death in 1915, the title passed to his elder son, Samuel John Gurney Hoare, who held several Cabinet positions in the 1930s and was elevated to the peerage as Viscount Templewood in 1944.

References

External links 
 

1841 births
1915 deaths
Baronets in the Baronetage of the United Kingdom
People educated at Harrow School
Conservative Party (UK) MPs for English constituencies
UK MPs 1885–1886
UK MPs 1886–1892
UK MPs 1892–1895
UK MPs 1895–1900
UK MPs 1900–1906